The National Association of the Deaf (NAD) is an organization for the promotion of the rights of deaf people in the United States. NAD was founded in Cincinnati, Ohio, in 1880 as a non-profit organization run by Deaf people to advocate for deaf rights, its first president being Robert P. McGregor of Ohio. It includes associations from all 50 states and Washington, DC, and is the US member of the World Federation of the Deaf, which has over 120 national associations of Deaf people as members. It has its headquarters in Silver Spring, Maryland.

All of its presidents were late-deafened until the 1970s. It is in charge of the Miss Deaf America Ambassador programs, which are held during the association's conventions. It has advocated for deaf rights in all aspects of life, from public transportation to education.

Mission statement
The mission of the National Association of the Deaf is "to preserve, protect and promote the civil, human and linguistic rights of deaf and hard of hearing people in the United States of America."

While it works for Deaf people, it also works to promote knowledge about the rights, culture, and language of Deaf people to hearing people.

Issues
The NAD advocates for any issues that are associated with deaf rights. It early worked to preserve sign language, especially under George Veditz. During his time as president, Veditz and other members of the NAD used the new film technology to capture individuals signing so that their language would never be lost.  Although African-Americans were not permitted to be members until later, starting in the early 20th century, the NAD advocated for vocational training for the "Colored Deaf" population. Because of the lack of rights afforded to blacks in NAD, several groups were formed, included National Black Deaf Advocates. The NAD has also fought to keep deaf teachers for teaching deaf students and for the opening of deaf residential schools across the country.  In 1909, President William Howard Taft signed a law allowing deaf individuals to take civil service exams only after the NAD fought to have this as a law. It was a strong advocate for having captioned films and in 1958, President Dwight Eisenhower signed a law requiring it.

The NAD strongly supported the students and faculty of Gallaudet University in the Deaf President Now protests of 1988. The Americans with Disabilities Act (ADA) of 1990 was also strongly fought for by the NAD. Most recently, the NAD has advocated for professional sports stadiums to provide captioning for the referees calls and for announcers' comments. The association has worked to require insurance companies to have deaf people as clients and for landlords to have deaf tenants. Hotels are now required to provide "deaf-friendly" alarm clocks and smoke detectors because of the NAD's persistence in the matter.

The NAD fights for the right of deaf individuals to be able to use American Sign Language and to be provided an interpreter. The NAD website gives information on all the rights of deaf individuals have and how to go about gaining them.

Controversies
In 2014, NAD filed a complaint with the United States Department of Justice Civil Rights Division alleging that thousands of lectures and other course content that had been made freely available via YouTube and iTunes by the University of California, Berkeley violated the Americans with Disabilities Act of 1990 because numerous lectures in the university's Massive open online course program featured automatically generated captions, which contained inaccuracies. In 2016, the Department of Justice concluded that the content would violate the ADA unless it was updated to conform to the current Web Content Accessibility Guidelines. In response, a university spokesperson stated that the costs of "captioning alone would exceed a million dollars" and that the university would comply with the DOJ order by removing all of the content from public access.

Milestones
 1896: The first woman (Julia Foley) was elected to the board of the NAD.
 1960: The Junior NAD was established.
 1964: Women members of the NAD were first allowed to vote.
 1965: Black members were first accepted into the NAD.
 1972: The first Miss Deaf America Pageant (called the Miss Deaf America Talent Pageant until 1976) was held during the NAD Convention in Miami Beach, Florida; the winner was Ann Billington.
 1980: Gertrude Galloway became the first female president of the NAD.

Awards
The biennial NAD conference includes awarding of various awards.

State associations
State associations are affiliated with but independent of the NAD. All 50 states and Washington, DC, have state associations, many of which provide a dual membership with the NAD. Some state associations receive their bylaws from the NAD.

See also
Americans with Disabilities Act of 1990
Rehabilitation Act of 1973#Section 504
Disability subsection on Accessibility
Deaf culture
Deaf history
Timeline of disability rights in the United States
Timeline of disability rights outside the United States
Laurent Clerc Awards
Robert G. Sanderson (1920–2012), NAD President Emeritus

References

Other sources
Gallaudet University Archives, Timeline: Gallaudet University and the Deaf Community
Dunn, Lindsay Moeletsi. Edited by Mervin D. Garretson. "Education, Culture and Community: The Black Deaf Experience." A Deaf American Monograph 45 (1995): 37–41.

External links

National Council for Interpreting in Health Care (United States)
A complete list of WFD members containing over 120 national associations of deaf people

Deafness rights organizations
Health and disability rights organizations in the United States
Organizations established in 1880
Deaf culture in the United States
1880 establishments in the United States